Kaloneri (previously Vrongista) is a village and the seat of the former Askio municipality in the Kozani regional unit, Greece. The population was 483 in 2011. The postal code is 50300.

A notable event of the area is the feast of St. Kyriaki.

References

Populated places in Kozani (regional unit)